Home-Keeping Hearts is a lost 1921 silent film rural melodrama directed by Carlyle Ellis. It was produced by an independent production company and released as an independent feature by Playgoers Pictures.

Cast
Thomas H. Swinton - Robert Colton
Mary Ryan - Mary Colton
Louella Carr - Laurel Stewart
Edward Grace - Squire Teal
Henry West - Timothy Reece

References

External links
  Home-Keeping Hearts at IMDb.com

1921 films
American silent feature films
1921 lost films
Lost American films
1921 drama films
Silent American drama films
American black-and-white films
Melodrama films
Lost drama films
1920s American films